The 1951 NCAA Cross Country Championships were the 13th annual cross country meet to determine the team and individual national champions of men's collegiate cross country running in the United States.

Since the current multi-division format for NCAA championship did not begin until 1973, all NCAA members were eligible. In total, 23 teams and 122 individual runners contested this championship.

The meet was hosted by Michigan State College on November 26, 1951, at the Forest Akers East Golf Course in East Lansing, Michigan. The distance for the race was 4 miles (6.4 kilometers).

The team national championship was won by the Syracuse Orangemen, their first. The individual championship was retained by Herb Semper, from Kansas, with a time of 20:09.74.

Men's title
Distance: 4 miles (6.4 kilometers)

Team Result (Top 10)

References

NCAA Cross Country Championships
NCAA Men's Cross Country Championships
Sports competitions in East Lansing, Michigan
NCAA Cross Country
November 1951 sports events in the United States
Michigan State University
Track and field in Michigan